Rohr is a municipality in the Schmalkalden-Meiningen district in Thuringia.

History
Rohr was first mentioned in 815.  A Benedictine monastery was established in the 9th century and a Carolingian church, St. Michaels, was built.  The monastery lasted for about 100 years but the church survives today.
In 1206 a Benedictine convent was established outside of town. The convent was closely associated with the House of Henneberg and to a lesser degree with the Bibra family especially in the 14th century. Kloster Rohr  was abandoned after reformation and is now a technical school. The shell of the former church was renovated into a modern building in the 2000s.

Population history

References

WERNER WAGENHÖFER, Grablegen des Niederadels im Spätmittelalterlichen Franken - das Beispiel der Bibra, Wirtschaft - Gesellschaft - Mentalitäten im Mittelalter, Festschrift zum 75.

External links
 History of Rohr 
 Kirchenburg Rohr
 Michaeliskirche in Rohr
 
 Kloster History 
 BTZ Technical School at former Kloster Rohr

Schmalkalden-Meiningen
House of Henneberg